Woolloongabba busway station is located in Brisbane, Australia serving the suburb of Woolloongabba. It opened on 13 September 2000 when the first section of the South East Busway opened from Melbourne Street, South Brisbane to coincide with the start of the 2000 Olympic football tournament, for which some matches were held in Brisbane. It initially opened for outbound services only, with inbound services commencing on 23 October 2000.

It is on a spur from the main trunk route, with inbound services joining the busway proper at Mater Hill. It is adjacent to the Gabba.

As part of the abandoned BaT Tunnel project, it was proposed to build a railway station adjacent to the busway station. This has been revived as Cross River Rail, with Woolloongabba railway station due to open in 2024.

It is served by 23 routes operated by Brisbane Transport as part of the TransLink network.

References

External links
[ Woolloongabba station] TransLink

Bus stations in Brisbane
Transport infrastructure completed in 2000
Woolloongabba